Neill of Summerhill is a 1983 biography of the educator A. S. Neill and his Summerhill School written by Jonathan Croall and published by Knopf Doubleday.

Notes

References 

 
 
 
 
 
 
 
 
 
 
 
 
 

1983 non-fiction books
English-language books
Books about education
Biographies (books)
Alfred A. Knopf books